Arad County is an administrative division (judeţ) of Romania roughly translated into county in the western part of the country on the border with Hungary, mostly in the region of Crișana and few villages in Banat. The administrative center of the county lies in the city of Arad. The Arad County is part of the Danube–Criș–Mureș–Tisa Euroregion.

Name
The county was named after its administrative center, Arad.

Geography
The terrain of Arad County is divided into two distinct units that cover almost half of the county each. The eastern side of the county has a hilly to low mountainous terrain (Dealurile Lipovei, Munții Zărandului, Munții Codru Moma) and on the western side it's a plain zone consisting of the Arad Plain, Low Mures Plain, and The High Vinga Plain. Taking altitude into account we notice that it follows a stepped pattern as it drops as we go from the east to the west of the county from 1489 m to below 100 m. In the east there are the Zarand Mountainsnand the Codru Moma Mountains, all subdivisions of the Apuseni Mountains, a major group of the Western Carpathians.

Neighbours

Alba County and Hunedoara County to the East.
Hungary to the West - Békés and Csongrád Counties.
Bihor County to the North.
Timiș County to the South.

Climate and precipitation
In terms of climate, the characteristics of Arad county have a typical temperate continental climate with oceanic influences, with a circulation of air masses with a predominantly western ordered direction visible from west to east, with increasing altitude. Average annual temperatures range from 10 °C in the lowlands, the hills and piedmonts 9 °C, 8 °C and 6 °C in the low mountains in the area of greatest height.
Average amounts of precipitation is between  annually in the lowlands,  annually in the hills and piedmonts and  annually in the mountainous area.

Hydrographic network
The hydrographic network is composed of the two main rivers plus their tributaries and channels.
 Mureṣ - Corbeasca, Troaş, Bârzava, Milova, Cladova
 Crișul Alb - Hălmăgel, Valea de la Lazuri, Tăcășele, Cremenoasa, Zimbru, Valea Deznei, Valea Monesei, Tălagiu, Honțisor, Chisindia, Cigher

Lakes, ponds and channels
 Tauț, Seleuș, Cermei, Rovine, Matca (Ghioroc) Lakes and Gypsy Pond
 Matca, Canalul Morilor, Canalul Morilor, Ier, Criș Channels

Demographics 

The main ethnic composition was, as follows:
 Romanians - 83.88%
 Hungarians - 9.06%
 Roma - 4.04%

Economy
Along with Timiș County it forms one of the most developed regions in Romania. Due to its proximity to the border, it attracts a great number of foreign investments. The agricultural potential is greatly put into value, Arad plains being considered one of the most important cereal and vegetable producing basins.

The predominant industries in the county are:
 Machine and automotive components
 Food
 Textiles
Natural resources in Arad, are worthy to be taken into account as there are oil and associated gases, points of extraction in the west of the county, molibden mines in the Săvârșin area, marble quarries at Căprioara and Moneasa, mineral waters at Lipova, Moneasa, Dorobanți, Curtici, Macea and uranium deposits in the NE part of the county.

Tourism 

The main tourist destinations are:

 The city of Arad;
 The Mureș Natural Floodplain Park;
 Bezdin Monastery;
 Hodoș-Bodrog Monastery (est. 1177);
 Lipova resort and city;
 Șoimoș, Dezna, and Șiria stone citadels;
 Moneasa resort;
 The areas around Săvârșin, Petriș, Macea, and Pecica.

Politics 

The Arad County Council, renewed at the 2020 local elections, consists of 32 counsellors, with the following party composition:

Administrative divisions

Arad County has 1 municipality, 9 towns and 68 communes with approximately 180 villages.
Municipalities
Arad - capital city; population: 172,827 (as of 2002)
Towns

Chișineu-Criș
Curtici
Ineu
Lipova
Nădlac
Pâncota
Pecica
Sântana
Sebiș

Communes

Almaș
Apateu
Archiș
Bata
Bârsa
Bârzava
Beliu
Birchiș
Bocsig
Brazii
Buteni
Cărand
Cermei
Chisindia
Conop
Covăsânț
Craiva
Dezna
Dieci
Dorobanți
Fântânele
Felnac
Frumușeni
Ghioroc
Grăniceri
Gurahonț
Hălmagiu
Hălmăgel
Hășmaș
Ignești
Iratoșu
Livada
Macea
Mișca
Moneasa
Olari
Păuliș
Peregu Mare
Petriș
Pilu
Pleșcuța
Săvârșin
Secusigiu
Seleuș
Semlac
Sintea Mare
Socodor
Șagu
Șeitin
Șepreuș
Șicula
Șilindia
Șimand
Șiria
Șiștarovăț
Șofronea
Tauț
Târnova
Ususău
Vărădia de Mureș
Vârfurile
Vinga
Vladimirescu
Zăbrani
Zădăreni
Zărand
Zerind
Zimandu Nou

Historical county

Administration
In 1930, the county was divided into nine districts (plăși):
Plasa Aradul-Nou (comprising 22 villages)
Plasa Chișineu-Criș (comprising 19 villages)
Plasa Hălmagiu (comprising 45 villages)
Plasa Ineu (comprising 15 villages)
Plasa Pecica (comprising 12 villages)
Plasa Sfânta Ana (comprising 13 villages)
Plasa Sebiș (comprising 37 villages)
Plasa Șiria (comprising 11 villages)
Plasa Radna (comprising 36 villages)

Subsequently, a tenth district was established having been carved out of Plasa Ineu:
Plasa Târnova (comprising 16 villages)

Administration was re-organized in 1947, comprising 13 districts:
Plasa Aradul-Nou
Plasa Chișineu-Criș
Plasa Curtici
Plasa Gurahonț
Plasa Hălmagiu
Plasa Ineu
Plasa Pecica
Plasa Radna
Plasa Săvârșin
Plasa Sebiș
Plasa Sfânta Ana
Plasa Șiria
Plasa Târnova

Population 
According to the 1930 census data, the county population was 423,469 inhabitants, 61.0% Romanians, 19.5% Hungarians, 12.3% Germans (Banat Swabians), 2.8% Slovaks, 2.1% Jews, as well as other minorities. From the religious point of view, 55.8% declared Eastern Orthodox, 26.5% Roman Catholic, 5.5% Reformed, 4.2% Greek Catholic, 3.2% Lutherans, 2.4% Jewish, 1% Baptists, as well as other minorities.

Urban population 
In 1930, the county's urban population was 77,181 inhabitants, 39.3% Romanians, 38.8% Hungarians, 9.1% Jews, 7.1% Germans (Banat Swabians), 1.7% Serbs and Croats, 1.4% Slovaks, as well as other minorities. In the urban area, languages were Hungarian (53.3%), Romanian (37.0%), German (6.0%), Serbian (1.4%), Yiddish (0.9%), as well as other minorities. From the religious point of view, the urban population was composed of Roman Catholics (38.5%), Eastern Orthodox (33.8%), Jewish (10.1%), Reformed (9.9%), Greek Catholics (4.0%), Lutherans (2.6%), as well as other minorities.

Industry
The county's capital, Arad, was the location of Romania's first automotive factory. During the 1920s, Astra cars and commercial vehicles were made at Arad. ASTRA Arad manufactured automobiles from 1922 to 1926. The factory had an output of 2 automobiles per working day as of 1922.

See also
Arad County of the Kingdom of Hungary

References

External links
 www.virtualarad.net

 
Counties of Romania
1925 establishments in Romania
1938 disestablishments in Romania
States and territories disestablished in 1938
States and territories established in 1925
1940 establishments in Romania
1950 disestablishments in Romania
States and territories established in 1940
States and territories disestablished in 1950
1968 establishments in Romania
States and territories established in 1968